Paris By Night 96 - Nhạc Yêu Cầu 2 (Music Requests 2) is a Paris By Night program produced by Thúy Nga that was filmed at the Knott's Berry Farm on April 18, 2009 and April 19, 2009 and release DVD from June 25, 2009. The show was MC'ed by Nguyễn Ngọc Ngạn and Nguyễn Cao Kỳ Duyên.

Trivia
The program is the 2nd part of the Nhạc Yêu Cầu series.

Track list

Disc 1

01. Phần Mở Đầu (Intro)

02. Liên Khúc Paris By Night Top Hits:
Một Kiếp Phong Ba (Lời Việt: Nhật Ngân) – Bảo Hân (performance from Paris By Night 34: Made In Paris)
Làm Sao Quên Được Em ©  (Quốc Tuấn) – Lương Tùng Quang (performance from Paris By Night 69: Nợ Tình)
Em Vẫn Tin (Lời Việt: Hồ Lệ Thu) – Hồ Lệ Thu (performance from Paris By Night 89: In Korea)
Tại Sao © (Trịnh Lam) – Trịnh Lam (performance from Paris By Night 86: PBN Talent Show – Semi-Finals)
Tình Chấp Nhận (Trần Đức) – Quỳnh Vi (performance from Paris By Night 89: In Korea)
Em Ở Đâu? © (Chí Tài) – Dương Triệu Vũ (performance from Paris By Night 93: Celebrity Dancing – Khiêu Vũ Của Các Ngôi Sao)
Ngày Xưa Anh Hỡi © (Đồng Sơn) – Minh Tuyết (performance from Paris By Night 71: 20th Anniversary)
Đắng Cay (Lương Bằng Vinh) – Lưu Bích (performance from Paris By Night 75: Về Miền Viễn Đông – Journey to the Far East)
Men Say Tình Ái (Lời Việt: Hoài An) – Như Loan (performance from Paris By Night 63: Dòng Thời Gian)
Tình Nhạt Phai (Caravan of Life) – Don Hồ (performance from Paris By Night 29: In Las Vegas)
Lầm (Lam Phương) – Nguyễn Hưng (performance from Paris By Night 28: Lam Phương 2 – Dòng Nhạc Tiếp Nối – Sacrée Soirée 3)
Trở Về Cát Bụi (Lê Dinh) – Thế Son (performance from Paris By Night 38: In Toronto)
Yêu © (Nhật Trung) – Hợp Ca (performance from Paris By Night 65: Yêu)

03. Liên Khúc: 
Chiều Mưa Biên Giới (Nguyễn Văn Đồng) – Mai Thiên Vân
Mấy Dặm Sơn Khê  (Nguyễn Văn Đồng) – Thanh Tuyền

04. Liên Khúc: 
Ðời Ðá Vàng (Vũ Thành An) – Khánh Hà
Tưởng Niệm (Trầm Tử Thiêng) – Trần Thái Hòa

05. Video Clip Thanh Bùi (from Australian Idol)

06. Mirror, Mirror! (Gương Thần, Gương Thần) (Thanh Bùi, Lời Việt: Viễn Trình) – Thanh Bùi

07. Phỏng Vấn Ca Sĩ Thanh Bùi

08. The Winner Takes It All (ABBA) – Thanh Bùi (Australian Idol)

09. Mùa Thu Cho Em (Ngô Thụy Miên) & Mộng Dưới Hoa (Nhạc: Phạm Đinh Chương, Thơ: Đinh Hùng) – Bằng Kiều & Trần Thu Hà

10. Liên Khúc: 
Ngúời Lính Già Xa Quê Hương (Nhật Ngân)
Những Đóm Mắt Hỏa Châu (Hân Châu)
Xin Anh Giữ Trọn Tình Quê (Duy Khánh)
– Duy Trường, Khánh Hoàng & Quỳnh Dung

11. Một Mai Nếu Em Đi (Ne Me Quittes Pas) (Lời Việt: Lê Xuân Trường) – Nguyễn Hưng & Hồ Lệ Thu

12. Giết Người Trong Mộng (Phạm Duy) – Ngọc Anh

13. Liên Khúc: 
Ngậm Ngùi (Phạm Duy, Thơ: Huy Cận) – Quang Tuấn
Mộ Khúc (Phạm Duy, Thơ: Xuân Diệu) – Ý Lan

14. Liên Khúc: 
Lại Nhớ Người Yêu
Ước Mộng Ðôi Ta 
– Phi Nhung & Mạnh Quỳnh

15. Phỏng Vấn Khán Giả Trong Rạp

16. Liên Khúc: Hởi Người Tình (Lời Việt: Ngọc Lan) – Tú Quyên & Như Loan

17. Cứ Ngũ Say (Nguyễn Hải Phong) – Mai Tiến Dũng & Hương Giang

18. Phỏng Vấn Khán Giả Trong Rạp

19. Liên Khúc: 
Tình Em Ngọn Nến (Lời Việt: Khúc Lan)
Tàn Tro (Lời Việt: Julie)
Dù Tình Yêu Đã Mất (Hoàng Nhạc Đô)
– Don Hồ & Minh Tuyết

20. Liên Khúc: 
Qua Cầu Gió Bay (Phạm Duy)
Buôn Bấc Buôn Dầu 
– Trần Thái Hòa & Ngọc Hạ

21. M.C. “Thư Hỏi Sợ Vợ”

Bonus MTV

 Ðôi Mắt Người Xưa (Ngân Giang, Ðạo Diễn: Hoàng Tuấn Cường) – Quang Lê

Disc 2

22. Hài Kịch: Áo Em Chưa Mặc Một Lần (Nguyễn Ngọc Ngạn) – Thúy Nga, Bằng Kiều, Chí Tài & Bé Tí

23. Phỏng Vấn Thúy Nga & Bằng Kiều

24. Nhạc Kịch: Ði Tìm Nửa Vầng Trăng
Tiễn Anh Về Với Người © (Tùng Châu & Thái Thịnh)
Tình Là Gì? (Thái Thịnh)
– Dương Triệu Vũ & Bảo Hân

25. Những Ðồi Hoa Sim (Dzũng Chinh, Thơ: Hữu Loan) – Mai Thiên Vân & Hoàng Oanh

26. Liên Khúc: 
Thói Ðời (Trúc Phương)
Trong Tầm Mắt Đời (Tú Nhi)
– Duy Trường & Lý Duy Vũ

27. Phỏng Vấn Ca Sĩ Duy Trường & Lý Duy Vũ

28. Khi Người Xa Tôi (Lê Xuân Trường) – Nguyệt Anh & Chuyện Tình Thường Thế Thôi (Lê Quang) – Thùy Vân

29. Thương Chị © (Nhật Ngân) – Hà Phương & Hương Thủy

30. Phỏng Vấn Ca Sĩ Tóc Tiên

31. Tóc Mây (Phạm Thế Mỹ) – Tóc Tiên

32. Lặng Thầm (Vũ Hoàng) – Thế Sơn & Phượng Hồng (Nhạc: Vũ Hoàng, Thơ: Đỗ Trung Quân) – Thái Châu

33. Liên Khúc: 
Một Cõi Ði Về (Trịnh Công Sơn)
Thành Phố Buồn (Lam Phương)
Như Cánh Vạt Bay (Trịnh Công Sơn)
– Khánh Ly & Chế Linh

34. Thôi Về Ði (Vĩnh Tâm) – Quỳnh Vi & Lam Anh

35. Dư Âm Tình Ta © (Hoài An) – Minh Tuyết & Trịnh Lam

36. Medley New Wave 80's – Thủy Tiên, Lưu Bích & Lương Tùng Quang

37.Finale

Bonus

 Hậu Trường Sân Khấu

Song: "Go With The Tien Anh", "Trade Sister", "Du Yin Love Me" was exclusive to Thuy Nga with the consent of the author. Translation prohibited any form criticism.

End credits

 Lighting designer: Simon Miles & Victor Fable
 Lighting director: Harry Sangmeister
 Production designer: Bruce Ryans & Cung Đỗ
 Musical director: Tùng Châu
 Associate producer: Kim Tô
 Line producer: Teresa Taylor
 Production manager: Richard Võ
 Production coordinator: Kiệt Cao – Lynn Givens – John Nguyễn
 Choreographer: Shanda Sawyer 
 Background graphic: Khanh Nguyễn – Cung Đỗ – Marie Tô
 Music arrangements: 
 Tùng Châu
 Tim Heintz (Một Mai Nếu Em Đi; Giết Người Trong Mộng; Tóc Mây; Thôi Về Ði)
 Nhật Trung (Opening Liên Khúc Top Hits; Ðời Ðá Vàng & Tưởng Niệm; Cứ Ngũ Say; Dư Âm Tình Ta)
 Đòng Sơn (Ngậm Ngùi & Mộ Khúc; Liên Khúc Tình Em Ngọn Nến, Tàn Tro, Dù Tình Yêu Đã Mất; Lặng Thầm & Phượng Hồng)
 Nguyễn Nhân (Medley New Wave 80's)
 Vũ Quang Trung (Mùa Thu Cho Em & Mộng Dưới Hoa)
 Thanh Bùi (Mirror, Mirror!)
 Ban Nhạc:
 Lead guitar: Nguyễn Hùng
 Acoustic guitar: Nguyễn Khoa
 Bass: Nguyễn Cường
 Keyboards: Nguyễn Bá Tỵ
 Drums: Peter Pfiefer
 Percussions: Trần Nam
 Piano: Phạm Duy Ái
 Đàn Tranh: Giang Thanh
 Flute/Sáo: Nguyễn Bảo Ngọc
 Sax, Oboe: Trần Bảo
 Violins:
 Paise Lam
 Trần Mai Ly
 Nguyễn Nguyệt Cầm
 Swan Nguyễn
 Cellos: Lydia Munchinsky
 Costume Dance Songs: Calvin Hiệp
 Assisted by Jacky Tài
 Wardrobe: Jacky Tài & Tony Võ
 Assistant choreographers: Eugenia Huang & Tracy Shibata
 PBN Dancers: Lilit Avagyan – Taeko Carrol – Stella Chloe – Anh Dillon – Kristen Egusa – Krystal Ellsworth – Eugenia Huang – Yoori Kim – Marissa Ruazol – Katee Shean – Tracy Shibata – Paula Van Oppen – Steven Bermundo – Zack Brazenas – Vinh Bui – Dominic Chaiduang – P.J. Halili – Chris Liu – Buddy Mynatt – Fred Odgaard
"Thương Chị"
 Choreographed by Luân Vũ
 Dancers: Trường Nghệ Thuật Dân Tộc Việt Cầm
 Make-up artists: Gordon Banh – Nhật Bình – Travis Vũ – Mona Lisa Nguyễn – Helena Phạm – Hương Vũ – Quân Phạm
 Hair stylists: Travis Vũ – Quincy Nguyễn – Philip Trương – Châu Hông
 Photographer: Huy Khiêm
 Assisted by Joe Hernandez
 Props: Stephanie Furr – Lưu Nguyễn – Markus Beniger
 Comedy Furniture:
 Euro Asian Furniture
 16039 Brookhurst St.
 Fountain Valley, CA 92708
 (714) 839 – 8809
 Art directors: Scott Heineman & Brian Livesay
 Staging supervisor: Thom Peachee
 Head carpenter: Scott Broeske
 Media server: Adrian Dickey
 PRG lead technician: Dave Seralles
 Gaffer: Maurice Dupleasis
 Best boy: Rob Kemery
 Technical director: Allan Wells
 Technical supervisor & video engineer: John Palacio
 Video engineer: Stuart Wesolik
 Video tape operator: Bruce Solberg
 Cameras: Danny Bonilla – Manny Bonilla – Joe Coppola – Suzanne Ebner – Suzanne Hylton – Katherine Lacafano – Allen Merriweather – Dennis Turner – Danny Webb
 Head video utility: Bill "Scratch" Griner
 Projection & LED technician: Nate Williams & Mike Russell
 Sound designer: Bart Chiate
 Sound mixer: Toby Foster
 Mixer: Eduardo Mackinlay
 Audio utility: Eddie Mckarge & Danny Ortiz
 BGI engineer in charge: Glenn Hazlett
 Director, entertainment Knotts Berry Farms: Craig Harreld
 Knotts Berry Farms theatre production manager: Lisa Heath
 Trucking: Scenic Expressions
 Set construction: Global Industries
 Lighting: PRG
 LED: Background Images
 Camera truck: Background Images
 Editors: Chris Osterhus & Khanh Nguyễn
 Assistant editor: Richard Buchanan
 Surround sound mixer: John Tomlinson
 Behind the scenes: Andy Vũ & Tony Hoàng
 RMI Cargo
 Viện Giải Phẩu Thẩm Mỹ Hạnh Phước (Houston, Texas)
 Little Saigon Radio
 Tuần Báo Việt Tide
 Hồn Việt TV
 Euro-Asian Furniture & Hệ Thống Kim Hoàn Ngọc Quang
 Nha Sĩ Lê Thanh Hằng
 Princess Cosmetics Surgery (Orange County, CA)
 Saving Call V247
 T4 Spa Concepts & Designs

Paris by Night

vi:Paris By Night 96